A peritoneal inclusion cyst is a cyst-like structure that appears in the pelvis due to non neoplastic reactive mesothelial proliferation, often as a consequence of prior episodes of pelvic inflammation, as can occur in pelvic inflammatory disease. It has the potential to mimic ovarian cysts, hydrosalpinx or even malignancy, due to its nonspecific anechoic appearance.

References

Cysts